Sand Quarry is a valley in Hickman County, Tennessee, in the United States.

Sand Quarry was named from deposits of sand which were mined there to be used in nearby blast furnaces.

References

Landforms of Hickman County, Tennessee
Valleys of Tennessee